This Place is a global art project that explores the complexity of Israel and the West Bank through the eyes of twelve internationally acclaimed photographers.  The participating artists are Frédéric Brenner, Wendy Ewald, Martin Kollar, Josef Koudelka, Jungjin Lee, Gilles Peress, Fazal Sheikh, Stephen Shore, Rosalind Solomon, Thomas Struth, Jeff Wall, and Nick Waplington. Each photographer created highly individualized works in response to his or her own experience in the area; the result is over 500 images which will be exhibited internationally and published in a series of monographs.

History
Initiated by Frédéric Brenner, the project follows in the tradition of historic endeavors such as the Missions Héliographiques in nineteenth-century France and the Farm Security Administration in the United States, which gathered artists who use photography to ask essential questions about culture, society and the inner lives of individuals.
Each artist spent approximately six months in residence, traveling throughout Israel and the West Bank, following his or her own line of investigation. Brenner offered the photographers initial exploratory visits, so they could decide if, and how, that wanted to be involved with the project. According to TIME: "This Place is not an act of photojournalism, nor does it contain — or send – a clear, unified message."

Exhibitions
The completed work has been organized into a major exhibition, curated by Charlotte Cotton, who stated that “Each artist has created a profound and personal narration of Israel and the West Bank, that, collectively, act a series of guides, leading the viewer into a deeper identification with the complexities and conflicts of the Holy Land." The exhibition will open at DOX Centre for Contemporary Art in Prague on October 24, 2014. It will then travel to the Tel Aviv Museum of Art, the Brooklyn Museum, the Norton Museum of Art, and other museums in Europe, the United States, and Asia.

Participating photographers

References

External links
 

Artist cooperatives
Photojournalism organizations
Israeli photography organizations